Amity Township is a township in Berks County, Pennsylvania. The population was 13,435 at the 2020 census. Amity Township, especially in the Douglassville area, is seeing growth in development.

The township was so named for the cordial relationship, or amity, between Swedish settlers and the local Native Americans.

History
The boundaries of Amity Township are almost identical to the boundaries of the original area known as Swedes’ tract.  During December 1699, Lutheran pastor Andreas Rudman had met with Governor William Penn.  Pastor Rudman pointed out that many of the residents of the former Swedish colony of New Sweden felt cheated by the preemption of their lands for Quaker settlement. Rudman secured an order from William Penn in October 1701 setting aside  up the Schuylkill River, near Manatawny Creek, for members of his congregation.

The George Douglass House, Griesemer-Brown Mill Complex, Old St. Gabriel's Episcopal Church, Old Swede's House, Rhoads-Lorah House and Barn, Weidner Mill, and White Horse Tavern are listed on the National Register of Historic Places.

Geography
It has a hot-summer humid continental climate (Dfa) and is located mostly in hardiness zone 6b, with that being 7a near the river, including Douglassville.

Adjacent townships
Exeter Township (west)
Oley Township (northwest)
Earl Township (north)
Douglass Township (east)
Union Township (south)

The census-designated place of Amity Gardens and the unincorporated community of Douglassville are both located in Amity Township, along the Schuylkill River.

Demographics
At the 2000 census, there were 8,867 people, 3,219 households, and 2,510 families in the township.  The population density was 484.5 people per square mile (187.1/km2).  There were 3,323 housing units at an average density of 181.6/sq mi (70.1/km2).  The racial makeup of the township was 95.68% White, 2.04% African American, 0.19% Native American, 0.67% Asian, 0.01% Pacific Islander, 0.38% from other races, and 1.03% from two or more races. Hispanic or Latino of any race were 1.00%.

There were 3,219 households, 37.7% had children under the age of 18 living with them, 68.0% were married couples living together, 6.7% had a female householder with no husband present, and 22.0% were non-families. 17.1% of households were made up of individuals, and 6.3% were one person aged 65 or older.  The average household size was 2.75 and the average family size was 3.12.

The age distribution was 27.7% under the age of 18, 5.6% from 18 to 24, 32.8% from 25 to 44, 24.1% from 45 to 64, and 9.8% 65 or older.  The median age was 36 years. For every 100 females there were 97.6 males.  For every 100 females age 18 and over, there were 95.3 males.

The median household income was $59,595 and the median family income  was $67,069. Males had a median income of $47,002 versus $31,389 for females. The per capita income for the township was $24,652.  About 2.5% of families and 4.8% of the population were below the poverty line, including 3.8% of those under age 18 and 9.8% of those age 65 or over.

Transportation

U.S. Route 422 is the most prominent highway serving Amity Township. It follows the Benjamin Franklin Highway and Pottstown Expressway along a northwest-southeast alignment across the southern portion of the township. Pennsylvania Route 562 follows Boyertown Pike along an east-west alignment along the northern edge of the township. Finally, Pennsylvania Route 662 follows Old Swede Road along a north-south alignment across the northern and eastern portions of the township.

Notable person
Anthony Sadowski, emigre who became an interpreter, trader and agent with local natives

References

External links

 Amity Township Official Website

Townships in Berks County, Pennsylvania